The 2020–21 Louisiana–Monroe Warhawks women's basketball team represented the University of Louisiana at Monroe during the 2020–21 NCAA Division I women's basketball season. The basketball team, led by first-year head coach Brooks Donald Williams, played all home games at the Fant–Ewing Coliseum along with the Louisiana–Monroe Warhawks men's basketball team. They were members of the Sun Belt Conference.

Previous season 
The Warhawks finished the 2019–20 season 3–26, 1–17 in Sun Belt play to finish eleventh in the conference. They failed to make it to the 2019-20 Sun Belt Conference women's basketball tournament. Following the season, all conference tournaments as well as all postseason play was cancelled due to the COVID-19 pandemic.

Offseason

Departures

Transfers

Recruiting

Roster

Schedule and results

|-
!colspan=9 style=| Non-conference Regular Season
|-

|-
!colspan=9 style=| Conference Regular Season
|-

|-
!colspan=9 style=| Sun Belt Tournament

See also
 2020–21 Louisiana–Monroe Warhawks men's basketball team

References

Louisiana–Monroe Warhawks women's basketball seasons
Louisiana–Monroe Warhawks
Louisiana–Monroe Warhawks women's basketball
Louisiana–Monroe women's basketball